The 1968–69 Toronto Maple Leafs season was the Toronto Maple Leafs 52nd season of the franchise, 42nd season as the Maple Leafs. Although the Maple Leafs made the playoffs, they were swept in the quarter-finals by Boston, suffering two crushing defeats at Boston Garden.

Offseason

NHL Draft

Regular season

Season standings

Record vs. opponents

Schedule and results

Playoffs
Quarter-finals

Player statistics

Regular season
Scoring

Goaltending

Playoffs
Scoring

Goaltending

Awards and records
 Tim Horton, runner-up, Norris Trophy.
 Tim Horton, 1968-69 NHL First Team All-Star

Transactions
The Maple Leafs have been involved in the following transactions during the 1968–69 season.

Trades

Intra-League Draft

Farm teams

References
 Maple Leafs on Hockey Database

Toronto Maple Leafs seasons
Toronto Maple Leafs season, 1968-69
Tor